Glenn Martin "Doc" Brady (September 30, 1935 – February 3, 2019) was an American football and baseball coach. He served as the head football coach at Chadron State College in Chadron, Nebraska (1972), the University of Wisconsin–Milwaukee (1973–1974), and California State University, Sacramento (1976–1977), compiling a career college football coaching record of 20–30–2.  Brady was also the head baseball coach at Sacramento State in 1977, tallying a mark of 9–33.

A native of Clinton, Louisiana, Brady lettered in football and track at Stephen F. Austin State College—now known as Stephen F. Austin State University. He earned a master's degree and a PhD at Louisiana State University (LSU).

Head coaching record

College football

References

1935 births
2019 deaths
American male middle-distance runners
Chadron State Eagles football coaches
Milwaukee Panthers football coaches
New Mexico State Aggies football coaches
Sacramento State Hornets football coaches
Sacramento State Hornets baseball coaches
Stephen F. Austin Lumberjacks football players
Western Illinois Leathernecks football coaches
College men's track and field athletes in the United States
High school football coaches in Louisiana
Louisiana State University alumni
People from Clinton, Louisiana
People from Liberty, Texas
Players of American football from Louisiana
Players of American football from Texas
Track and field athletes from Louisiana